Seaview is a village in Nelson Mandela Bay in the Eastern Cape province of South Africa.

References

Populated places in Nelson Mandela Bay